The 2016 ATP Challenger Torino was a professional tennis tournament played on clay courts. It was the second edition of the tournament which was part of the 2016 ATP Challenger Tour. It took place in Turin, Italy between 18 and 24 April.

Singles main-draw entrants

Seeds

 1 Rankings as of 11 April 2016

Other entrants
The following players received wildcards into the singles main draw:
  Salvatore Caruso
  Stefano Napolitano
  Lorenzo Sonego
  Edoardo Eremin

The following player received entry into the singles main draw as special exempt:
  Enrique López Pérez

The following players received entry from the qualifying draw:
  Joris De Loore
  Pedro Sousa
  Matthias Bachinger
  Nikola Mektić

Champions

Singles

 Gastão Elias def.  Enrique López Pérez, 3–6, 6–4, 6–2

Doubles

 Andrej Martin /  Hans Podlipnik def.  Rameez Junaid /  Mateusz Kowalczyk, 4–6, 7–6(7–3), [12–10]

External links 
 Official website

ATP Challenger Torino
ATP Challenger Torino